The 2011 V-League was the 55th season of Vietnam's professional football league.

Eximbank have taken over as official sponsor of the V-League.

Teams 
Nam Định were relegated to the 2011 Vietnamese First Division after finishing the 2010 season in last place.

They were replaced by Hà Nội ACB.

Navibank Sài Gòn defeated Than Quảng Ninh in the end of season promotion/relegation match to secure their place in the V-League.

Stadia and locations

Managerial changes

League table

Positions by round

Results

Top goalscorers
The Top Scorers as of 17 July 2011:

Awards

Monthly awards

Annual awards

Dream Team

References

External links 
 Vietnam Football Federation

Vietnamese Super League seasons
Vietnam
Vietnam
1